Fear Not is a 1917 American silent crime drama film directed by Allen Holubar and starring Agnes Vernon, Miles McCarthy and Murdock MacQuarrie.

Cast
 Agnes Vernon as Hilda Mornington 
 Miles McCarthy as James Mornington 
 Murdock MacQuarrie as Allen Mornington
 Joseph W. Girard as Mortimer Gildane
 Frank Borzage as Franklin Shirley

References

Bibliography
 Robert B. Connelly. The Silents: Silent Feature Films, 1910-36, Volume 40, Issue 2. December Press, 1998.

External links
 

1917 films
1917 drama films
1910s English-language films
American silent feature films
American drama films
American black-and-white films
Universal Pictures films
Films directed by Allen Holubar
1910s American films
Silent American drama films